Kidron may refer to:

Kidron (surname)
Qatra, thought to be the biblical site of Kidron mentioned in the first Book of Maccabees
Kidron Valley, a valley near Jerusalem.
Kidron, Israel, a moshav near Gedera, which is named after a biblical settlement.
Kidron, Ohio, an unincorporated community in Wayne County, Ohio, United States
Kidron, a horse ridden by General John J. Pershing.